Kobylkino is a rural locality (a village) in Kichmegnskoye Rural Settlement, Kichmengsko-Gorodetsky District, Vologda Oblast, Russia. The population was 18 as of 2002.

Geography 
Kobylkino is located 32 km east of Kichmengsky Gorodok (the district's administrative centre) by road. Kobylsk is the nearest rural locality.

References 

Rural localities in Kichmengsko-Gorodetsky District